Wave Music is an independent dance music record label founded in 1995 by François Kevorkian, headquartered in New York City.

Its catalog features a wide spectrum of musical styles by many different artists, as well as several compilation series, such as Body&SOUL-NYC, Deep&Sexy, Bossa Mundo, and Frequencies.

Over the years, Wave Music has launched a variety of imprints (sub-labels) such as Wavetec, clicktracks, Wave Classics, Streetwave, and Deep Space Media.
As well, it distributes other independent labels such as Chez Music and Bombay Records.

Selected list of artists

 Abstract Truth
 Boyd Jarvis
 Fonda Rae
 François K.
 Kevin Aviance
 Solu Music

See also
 List of record labels

External links
 Wave Music Official Site
 Discogs Listing for Wave Music
 Wave Music on MySpace

Record labels established in 1995
American independent record labels
Electronic dance music record labels